Hindu chronology may refer to:

Indian astronomy
Hindu calendar
Hindu units of time
Yuga - in philosophy, the name of an "epoch" or "era" within a cycle of four ages
 Vedic-Puranic chronology - an overview of Hindu history based on the Puranas
Timeline of Hindu texts